The following highways are numbered 614:

Canada
Ontario Highway 614
Saskatchewan Highway 614

Costa Rica
 National Route 614

United States